Storfjorden (English: Great Fjord) is the body of water separating Spitsbergen in the west from Barentsøya and Edgeøya to the east. Its southern limits are Kikutodden in Sørkapp Land east to Håøya, Tiholmane, Brækmoholmane, and Menkeøyane in Thousand Islands and northeast to Negerpynten—the southeastern promontory of Edgeøya. Its limits on its eastern side are Sundneset on the northern side of Freemansundet south to Palibinramten on the northwest coast of Edgeøya. The northern part is called Ginevra Bay, which lies between Olav V Land and Barentsøya. It ends at Heleysundet.

Storfjorden was historically known as Wybe Jans Water, named after the Frisian whaler Wybe Jansz van Stavoren. The fjord was first labelled as such in 1620.

References
Conway, W. M. 1906. No Man's Land: A History of Spitsbergen from Its Discovery in 1596 to the Beginning of the Scientific Exploration of the Country. Cambridge: At the University Press. 
Norwegian Polar Institute Place Names of Svalbard Database
Watermass transformations in Storfjorden (R. Skogsetha, P.M. Haugan and M. Jakobsson.  Elsevier Ltd. 2004 

Fjords of Svalbard
Landforms of Spitsbergen
Barentsøya
Edgeøya